Bernard Grant (born 6 August 1962) was a Scottish footballer who played for Dumbarton, East Fife, East Stirlingshire and Ayr United.

References

1962 births
Scottish footballers
Sportspeople from Rutherglen
Dumbarton F.C. players
Greenock Morton F.C. players
Stirling Albion F.C. players
Motherwell F.C. players
Scottish Football League players
Living people
Association football midfielders
Footballers from South Lanarkshire